Lawrence C. Becker (April 26, 1939 – November 22, 2018) was an American philosopher working mainly in the areas of ethics and social, political, and legal philosophy.

Work
Becker is the author of books and journal articles on justice, Stoicism and Modern Stoicism, reciprocity, property rights, and metaethics. He was an associate editor of the journal Ethics from 1985–2000, and the editor, with the librarian Charlotte B. Becker, of two editions of the Encyclopedia of Ethics.

Becker is a Fellow of Hollins University, where he taught philosophy from 1965–1989, and is Professor of Philosophy Emeritus from the College of William & Mary, where he was the William R. Kenan, Jr. Professor in the Humanities and Philosophy from 1989–2001.

From 2000–2011 he was on the volunteer Board of Directors of Post-Polio Health International, and served as its President and Chair from 2006–2009.

Books authored
Habilitation, Health, and Agency: a Framework for Basic Justice. New York: Oxford University Press, 2012. E-book, 2013.
A New Stoicism.  Princeton: Princeton University Press, 1998. 
 Paperback issued by Princeton University Press, 1999. 
 E-book, 2010.
 Revised Edition, 2017.
Reciprocity. London and New York: Routledge, 1986. Pbk issued by the University of Chicago Press, 1990. Reissued by Routledge in hbk and e-book, 2014.
Property Rights: Philosophic Foundations.  London and New York, Routledge & Kegan Paul, 1977. Pbk, 1980. Reissued by Routledge in hbk and e-book, 2014.
On Justifying Moral Judgments. London: Routledge & Kegan Paul, 1973. Reissued by Routledge in hbk and e-book, 2014.

Books edited with Charlotte B. Becker
Encyclopedia of Ethics. Second edition in three volumes.  New York: Routledge, 2001. (First Edition in 2 volumes: New York: Garland Publishing, 1992.)
A History of Western Ethics. Second Edition, revised with expanded index and glossary. New York: Routledge, 2003. (First Edition, New York:  Garland Publishing, 1992).

Book edited with Kenneth Kipnis
Property: Cases, Concepts, and Critiques. Englewood Cliffs, New Jersey: Prentice-Hall, 1984.

General editor for book series
Ethical Investigations: A Routledge Series of Article Collections. New York: Routledge, 2003. Two collections (6 vols. each) of classic journal articles. Carl Wellman, ed., Rights and Duties; Peter Vallentyne, ed., Equality and Justice.

See also
List of American philosophers
Encyclopedia of Ethics
International Ventilator Users Network
Reciprocity (social and political philosophy)
Stoicism

References

External links
 Bio blurb and CV
 Message on the passing of Lawrence C. Becker

1939 births
20th-century American philosophers
21st-century American philosophers
21st-century American male writers
American ethicists
Political philosophers
Philosophers from Virginia
20th-century American male writers
20th-century American non-fiction writers
21st-century American non-fiction writers
American male non-fiction writers
2018 deaths